The McCloud River is a  long river that flows east of and parallel to the upper Sacramento River, in Siskiyou County and Shasta County in northern California in the United States. Protected under California's Wild and Scenic Rivers Act (1972),  it drains a scenic mountainous area of the Cascade Range, including part of Mount Shasta. It is a tributary of the Pit River, which in turn flows into the Sacramento River. The three rivers join in Shasta Lake, formed by Shasta Dam north of Redding.

History
The river was originally known as the "McLeod River", after the Hudson's Bay Company hunter and trapper Alexander Roderick McLeod who explored it during the winter of 1829-1830.  By the 1860s, the spelling "McCloud" was widely used, likely because that was the conventional American spelling of the Scottish name, and perhaps in part to honor California pioneer Ross McCloud, who settled there in 1855.

Geography
The McCloud River watershed drains . It flows initially west, passing south of Mount Shasta and receiving streams that drain the southern slope of the peak. East of McCloud it forms a series of waterfalls which tumble over basaltic lava flows, known collectively as the McCloud River Falls or Falls of the McCloud River.

Below the falls the river flows generally south-southwest through the Lake McCloud reservoir and through a deep canyon in the Shasta-Trinity National Forest.

Major tributaries to the Upper McCloud River include Mud and Tate Creeks (plus Big Springs). Squaw Valley, Hawkins, Claiborne, and Chatterdown Creeks are the major tributaries to the McCloud River below McCloud Reservoir.

River modifications
The river is dammed at McCloud River Dam, to provide water for the McCloud-Pit Hydroelectric Project. The McCloud Tunnel diverts water from the McCloud River east to Iron Canyon Reservoir; the water is discharged into the Pit River at James B. Black Powerhouse. Further downstream, the diverted water boosts power generation at Pit 6 and Pit 7 Dams before flowing into Shasta Lake. The overall generating capacity is 364 megawatts. Built in the late 1960s, the system is owned and operated by PG&E.

The greatest impact on river flow is during the summer months when the dam release is only . However, there is little impact on winter peak flows, which mostly originate in the watershed area below the dam.

Recreation
The McCloud is generally divided into two sections. The Upper McCloud is considered to be above McCloud Reservoir, and the Lower McCloud stretches from the reservoir to Lake Shasta. The waterfalls mentioned above are all found on the Upper McCloud. The Upper McCloud is a popular destination for kayakers. There is an improved campground called Fowlers on the Upper McCloud. The Upper McCloud above Upper Falls is rarely stocked, and locating the fish often proves to be a challenge to most avid anglers, while the section from Lower Falls to Upper Falls is stocked and is open to bait fishing. The Lower McCloud is generally a fly/artificial lure fishery and catch and release fishing is greatly encouraged.

The last several miles of the McCloud comprise two private fishing clubs — the McCloud River Club and the Bollibokka Club, founded in 1902 and 1904, respectively. The land encompassing the lower  of Bollibokka Club was purchased in 2007 by the Westlands Water District, which continues to operate the historic Bollibokka Club. The upper  of the club's river holdings were purchased in 2006 by Silicon Valley real estate magnate John Arrillaga. Anglers are not allowed to set foot above the high water mark on either property. The Nature Conservancy has a site on the Lower McCloud, an outright gift from the neighboring McCloud River Club, that allows ten rods per day and unlimited hikers or birders.

There are two campgrounds on the Lower McCloud River — Ash Camp and Ah Di Nah Campground. It sits at the junction of Hawkins Creek and the Lower McCloud.

It is a Shasta-Trinity National Forest campground and a fee is charged for nightly camping. Ah Di Nah is popular with backpackers and anglers for its proximity to the Pacific Crest Trail and the Nature Conservancy area on the McCloud River. Bathrooms and water are available.

Ecology
The McCloud once hosted a native population of bull trout (Salvelinus confluentus), but the species became extinct in the McCloud watershed after McCloud Reservoir cut off the fish from their spawning grounds. The last reported Bull trout (misidentified as Dolly Varden trout (Salvelinus malma) at that time, Dollys are not from this southern latitude) was caught in the 1980s.

The Upper McCloud and its tributaries above Middle Falls are home to the McCloud River redband (Oncorhynchus mykiss stonei), a native subspecies of rainbow trout. These redband trout were proposed for endangered species status, as their genetics have been introgressed by hybridization with hatchery stocked rainbow trout. The Falls of the McCloud River form a natural barrier to rainbow trout migration historically. An amplified fragment length polymorphism study show Sheepheaven Creek (the type specimen) genetics to be sufficiently different to warrant subspecific status. Conservation efforts have included transplanting the relative pure Sheepheaven Creek strain into Swamp and Trout Creeks.

Threats 
The McCloud ecosystem faces threats to the various cultural sites along the river and the general river ecosystem health. In November 2020, the Trump Administration under the direction of then U.S. Secretary of the Interior, David Bernhardt, approved plans to increase the nearby Shasta Dam by 18.5 feet. The consequences would include the flooding of 5,000 acres of the local habitat which would harm the wild trout fishery as well as introduce permanent and seasonal flooding of roughly 39 sacred Winnemem Wintu Tribe sites that are located along the McCloud River. 

The river system is closely tied to the Winnemem Wintu Tribe's culture as the tribe once lived in the greater Siskiyou Region and depended greatly on the river as a source of food and a setting for cultural ceremonies. In 1945, the completion of the Shasta Dam on the Sacramento River harmed the river's salmon population. It also led to the flooding of 95% of Winnemem Wintu territory, this included about 250 cultural sites, such as burial sites, and whole villages. The Central Valley Project Land Acquisition Act of 1941 had issued portions of over 4,000 acres of land in order to recompense tribal territories that were flooded and damaged. However, the U.S. Federal Government failed to deliver compensation and instead created a cemetery for the 183 Winnemem Wintu bodies that were displaced from their burial sites along the McCloud.

Gallery

References

External links
360 degree view of Middle Falls of McCloud River

Rivers of Siskiyou County, California
Tributaries of the Sacramento River
Mount Shasta
Pit River
Shasta-Trinity National Forest
Rivers of Northern California
Waterfalls of California